The Eastbank Esplanade (officially Vera Katz Eastbank Esplanade) is a pedestrian and bicycle path along the east shore of the Willamette River in Portland, Oregon, United States. Running through the Kerns, Buckman, and Hosford-Abernethy neighborhoods, it was conceived as an urban renewal project to rebuild the Interstate 5 bicycle bypass washed out by the Willamette Valley Flood of 1996.  It was renamed for former Portland mayor Vera Katz in November 2004 and features a statue of her near the Hawthorne Bridge.

Description
The project, designed by landscape architects Mayer/Reed, cost $30 million, of which $10 million built a lower deck on the Steel Bridge. The esplanade extends  from the Steel Bridge to the Hawthorne Bridge.  The south end connects to the Springwater Corridor, a rail trail that runs south to Sellwood, then east to Gresham, then south to Boring. The esplanade includes a  floating walkway, the longest of its kind in the United States.  Connected to this is a  public dock. Thirteen markers along the esplanade correspond to the eastside street grid.

History 
Construction began in October 1998, and the walkway was dedicated in May 2001.

The esplanade was closed for 21 days due to high river levels in 2011, the first time it had been closed since it was built.

On the same day in February 2015, two dead bodies were discovered along the esplanade. The events appear to be unrelated.

Public art
Public artworks installed along the esplanade include Alluvial Wall, Echo Gate, the Ghost Ship sculpture, the statue of Vera Katz and Stack Stalk.

See also
 Kevin Duckworth Memorial Dock

References

External links

 Portland Development Commission Eastbank Esplanade site
 American Society of Landscape Architects, 2004 Design Award of Merit

 

2001 establishments in Oregon
Bike paths in Oregon
Bridges completed in 2001
Bridges in Portland, Oregon
Buckman, Portland, Oregon
Hosford-Abernethy, Portland, Oregon
Parks in Portland, Oregon
Pedestrian bridges in Oregon
Pontoon bridges in the United States
Steel bridges in the United States
Tourist attractions in Portland, Oregon
Waterfronts
Willamette River